The 2004–05 FA Premier League (known as the FA Barclays Premiership for sponsorship reasons) began on 14 August 2004 and ended on 15 May 2005. Arsenal were the defending champions after going unbeaten the previous season. Chelsea won the title with a then record 95 points, which was previously set by Manchester United in the 1993–94 season, and later surpassed by Manchester City in the 2017–18 season (100), securing the title with a 2–0 win at the Reebok Stadium against Bolton Wanderers. Chelsea also broke a number of other records during their campaign, most notably breaking the record of most games won in a single Premier League campaign, securing 29 wins in the league in home and away matches, which was later surpassed by themselves in the 2016–17 season.

Season summary
Arsenal were the favourites to defend their title after finishing the previous season unbeaten, but they also faced competition in the form of regular challengers Manchester United and Chelsea, the latter under the new management of Portuguese José Mourinho, who had just won the UEFA Champions League with Porto. Liverpool also had a new manager in Spaniard Rafael Benítez, who had just won La Liga and the UEFA Cup with Valencia and were expected to challenge for the title too. Another managerial change at a club aiming for the top was at Tottenham Hotspur, who appointed Jacques Santini, who had just led France to the quarter-finals of the 2004 European Championship.

At the other end of the table, amongst those tipped for relegation were Norwich City, Crystal Palace and West Bromwich Albion, having all just been promoted from the First Division (which was rebranded this season as the Championship). Everton, Manchester City, Blackburn Rovers and Portsmouth were also tipped to struggle, the first three finishing just outside the relegation places the previous season and Portsmouth being in their second season.

Arsenal's record-breaking unbeaten streak of 49 games was ended on 24 October 2004, when Manchester United beat them 2–0 at Old Trafford.

For the first time since the advent of the Premier League in 1992, no team was mathematically relegated before the final day of the season. In each of the last three weekends of the season, the team that was bottom of the table at the start of the weekend finished it outside the drop zone. The final round of the season started on 15 May with West Bromwich Albion at the bottom, Southampton and Crystal Palace one point ahead and Norwich City a further point ahead, in the last safe spot.

West Brom, who had been bottom of the table and eight points from safety on Christmas Day, did their part by defeating Portsmouth at home 2–0. Norwich, the only side to have their fate completely in their own hands, lost 6–0 at Fulham and went down. Southampton lost 2–1 at home to Manchester United and were relegated after 27 years in the top flight and did not return to the top flight for 7 years. Palace, away to Charlton Athletic, were leading 2–1 after 71 minutes, but with eight minutes to go, Charlton's Jonathan Fortune equalised to relegate Palace, who did not return for 8 years, where they finally avoided relegation for the first time in the Premier League era. Thus, West Brom stayed up, becoming the first club in Premier League history to avoid relegation after being bottom of the table at Christmas.

At the end of the 90 minutes in all four matches, cameras focused on West Brom's home ground, The Hawthorns, as confirmation of other results began to filter through. Once the realisation dawned on the players and fans that survival had been achieved, a mass pitch invasion was sparked, with huge celebrations. The Portsmouth fans joined in the celebrations as, through losing, they had "helped" relegate arch-rivals Southampton.

Teams
Twenty teams competed in the league – the top seventeen teams from the previous season and the three teams promoted from the First Division. The promoted teams were Norwich City, West Bromwich Albion and Crystal Palace, returning to the top flight after an absence of nine, one and six years respectively. They replaced Leicester City, Leeds United and Wolverhampton Wanderers, who had been relegated to the Championship. Leicester City and Wolverhampton Wanderers were relegated after a season's presence while Leeds United ended their top flight spell of fourteen years.

Stadiums and locations

Personnel and kits

Managerial changes

League table

Results

Top scorers

Awards

Monthly awards

Annual awards

PFA Players' Player of the Year
The PFA Player's Player of the year award was won by Chelsea captain John Terry.

The shortlist for the PFA Players' Player of the Year award, in alphabetical order, was as follows:
Petr Cech (Chelsea)
Steven Gerrard (Liverpool)
Thierry Henry (Arsenal)
Andrew Johnson (Crystal Palace)
Frank Lampard (Chelsea)
Paul Scholes (Manchester United)
John Terry (Chelsea)

PFA Young Player of the Year
Manchester United striker Wayne Rooney was the recipient for this award.

PFA Fans' Player of the Year
Chelsea midfielder Frank Lampard won this award for the first time.

PFA Team of the year
Goalkeeper – Petr Čech 
Defenders – Gary Neville, John Terry, Rio Ferdinand, Ashley Cole 
Midfielders – Shaun Wright-Phillips, Frank Lampard, Steven Gerrard, Arjen Robben 
Strikers – Thierry Henry, Andy Johnson

FWA Footballer of the Year
Chelsea midfielder Frank Lampard won this award.

Premier League Player of the Season
Chelsea's midfielder Frank Lampard won the Premier League Player of the Season award.

Premier League Golden Boot
Arsenal and French striker Thierry Henry won the Premier League Golden Boot award for the third time in his career with 25 goals.

Premier League Golden Glove
Chelsea goalkeeper Petr Čech won the Premier League Golden Glove, for 25 clean sheets, in his debut season as he set a remarkable record of 10 consecutive clean sheets, as Chelsea won the title.

Premier League Manager of the Season
José Mourinho was awarded the Premier League Manager of the Season award after he led Chelsea to their first Premier League title, second Top division title in their history. During his first season at the club, Chelsea won the Premier League title (their first league title in 50 years) and the League Cup. The season was also notable for the number of records set during the season: Fewest goals against in a Premier League season (15), most clean sheets kept in a season (25), most wins in a season (29), most consecutive away wins (9) and the most points in a season (95).

Premier League Fair Play Award
The Premier League Fair Play Award is merit given to the team who has been the most sporting and best behaved team. Arsenal won the award for the second year in a row, ahead of Tottenham. The least sporting side for 2004–05 was Blackburn Rovers, who achieved a significantly lower fair play score than any other side.

See also
2004–05 in English football

References

External links
2004–05 FA Premier League Season at RSSSF

 
Premier League seasons
Eng
1